Archana Bhattacharyya (born 1948) is an Indian physicist. She specializes in the field of ionospheric physics, geomagnetism, and space weather and is Director of the Indian Institute of Geomagnetism, Navi Mumbai.

Education
Bhattacharyya completed B.Sc. (Hons) and M.Sc. in physics from the University of Delhi in 1967 and 1969, respectively. She also held a National Science Talent Scholarship (1964–69). She received PhD degree in physics from Northwestern University (1975), working in the area of theoretical condensed matter physics.

Career
Bhattacharyya joined the Indian Institute of Geomagnetism (IIG), Mumbai in 1978. She worked with the group of KC Yeh at the University of Illinois, Urbana-Champaign during 1986-87 and during 1998–2000 she was a Senior NRC Resident Research Associate at the Air Force Research Laboratory in Massachusetts, USA. She was the Director of IIG during 2005–2010. Currently, she is an Emeritus Scientist at IIG.

Awards and honours
The Professor KR Ramanathan Memorial Lecture and Medal by the Indian Geophysical Union in 2008
Dr. KS Krishnan Gold Medal by the University of Delhi in 1969
Fellow of the Indian Academy of Sciences and National Academy of Sciences, India.

Research interests
Plasma instabilities in the equatorial ionosphere
Probing the ionosphere with radio waves
Effects of space weather on the ionosphere
Spatio-temporal variations of the geomagnetic field

References

Indian women physicists
Bengali physicists
20th-century Indian physicists
Articles created or expanded during Women's History Month (India) - 2014
1948 births
Living people
Delhi University alumni
Indian women earth scientists
20th-century Indian women scientists
21st-century Indian women scientists
20th-century Indian earth scientists
Women scientists from Maharashtra
Indian condensed matter physicists
21st-century Indian earth scientists
21st-century Indian physicists
Indian academic administrators
Women academic administrators
Indian women academics